The 2020–21 Hong Kong Second Division League was the 7th season of the Hong Kong Second Division since it became the third-tier football league in Hong Kong in 2014–15. The season began on 29 November 2020.

Effects of the COVID-19 pandemic
Due to the forced cancellation of the 2019–20 season, there were no teams relegated into the Third Division this season.

League table

References

Hong Kong Second Division League seasons
2020–21 in Hong Kong football